Cut Meat Creek is a stream in the U.S. state of South Dakota.

Cut Meat Creek was so named for the fact cows were butchered there.

See also
List of rivers of South Dakota

References

Rivers of Mellette County, South Dakota
Rivers of Todd County, South Dakota
Rivers of South Dakota